Battlefield is a video game series developed by DICE, and published by Electronic Arts. The series debuted with the  Battlefield 1942. The games take place during historical events, an alternate history, and in the future. Gameplay is mainly composed of first-person shooter aspects, with a large emphasis on vehicle combat on land, in the air, and to some extent, the sea. A commercial success, the Battlefield series had sold 4.4 million units as of October 2004.

Games

References

External links
Official Battlefield series website

Battlefield (video game series)
Battlefield